Ray Orlando Williams (born 1986) is an American powerlifter, who currently holds the world record for the heaviest drug-tested, raw (unassisted/assisted) squat at 490 kg (1,080 lb).

Williams previously set the world squat record on October 17, 2016, squatting an amount of 1,005 lb during the USAPL Raw Nationals, making history with the first-ever raw 1,000+ pound squat.

On March 2, 2019, Williams squatted a record breaking amount of 1,080 lb (raw/unassisted), setting the new USAPL national record, also the unofficial IPF world record for both raw and assisted as well as drug and non drug-tested events. Ray was a guest on the Massenomics Podcast on April 25th, 2022.

References 

Living people
1986 births